The brown tanager (Orchesticus abeillei) is a small South American bird in the tanager family Thraupidae. It is the only member of the genus Orchesticus.

As suggested by its name, the plumage is overall brown. The bill is relatively thick. It forages in the canopy and is typically seen in pairs. It is generally uncommon, but known from several protected areas, such as the Itatiaia National Park.

It will catch insects in the air; in a manner often referred to as sallying. It will also take insects directly off plants.

It lays 2 eggs with a pinkish hue. The larger end of the egg is speckled with brown and lavender.

Taxonomy
The brown tanager was formally described in 1839 by the French naturalist René Lesson under the binomial name Pyrrhula abeillei. The species was moved to its own monospecific genus Orchesticus in 1851 by the German ornithologist Jean Cabanis. The type locality is Rio de Janeiro in Brazil. The genus name is from the Ancient Greek orkhēstikos meaning "good at dancing". The specific epithet abeillei was chosen to honour the French collector and naturalist M. Abeillé. Within the Thraupidae the brown tanager is placed with the yellow-shouldered grosbeak in the subfamily Orchesticinae. The species is monotypic: no subspecies are recognised.

References

brown tanager
Birds of the Atlantic Forest
Endemic birds of Brazil
brown tanager
Taxa named by René Lesson
Tanagers